William James Muhm (born June 27, 1957) is an American prelate of the Roman Catholic Church.  He has served as auxiliary bishop for the Archdiocese for the Military Services, USA since 2019.

Biography

Early life 
William (Bill) Muhm was born in Billings, Montana on June 27, 1957, the son of James and Anne Muhm.  When he was a child, the family moved to Denver, Colorado. Muhm attended Colorado Statue University in Fort Collins, Colorado, where he received a BS degree in Business Administration in 1980. After college graduation, he entered the US Navy Officer Training Command Newport in Newport, Rhode Island.  In July 1981, Muhm was commissioned an ensign in the Navy Supply Corps. 

Muhm's first posting in the Navy was two tours on the USS Belleau Wood (LHA-3), an amphibious assault ship, in the Western Pacific Ocean. His next assignment was at the Naval Air Engineering Station Lakehurst in Lakehurst, New Jersey. In 1986, Muhm left the Navy to work as an accountant while remaining in the US Naval Reserve.

By 1989, Muhm had decided to enter the priesthood and went into the minor seminary for the Archdiocese of New York.  He later graduated from St. Joseph’s Seminary in Yonkers, New York, the major seminary for the archdiocese.

Priesthood 
In May 1995, Muhm was ordained to the priesthood by Cardinal John O'Connor for the Archdiocese of New York at St. Patrick's Cathedral in New York City.  After his ordination, Muhm was posted to St. Ann Parish in Ossining, New York for one year, then sent to Holy Family Parish in Staten Island, New York for the next two years.  In 1996, he was also assigned as chaplain to Fleet Hospital 22.

In 1998, the Navy recalled Muhm to active duty, this time as a member of the United States Navy Chaplain Corps. His assignments included an extended deployment on the USS WASP (LHD-1), an amphibious assault ship, in the Arabian Sea after the September 11th attacks. He also served with the 1st Marine Division in Anbar Province, Iraq during the Iraq Insurgency. Muhn also had assignments at the U.S. Naval Academy in Annapolis, Maryland, and at Camp Lejuene in Jacksonville, North Carolina.  Muhm retired from the Navy on May 1, 2018 with the rank of Navy Captain.

Auxiliary Bishop of the Military Services USA 
Pope Francis appointed Muhm as auxiliary bishop for the Archdiocese for the Military Services, USA and titular bishop of Capsus on January 22, 2019. On March 25, 2019, Muhm was installed and consecrated by Archbishop Timothy Broglio at the Basilica of the National Shrine of the Immaculate Conception in Washington, D.C.

See also
 

 Catholic Church hierarchy
 Catholic Church in the United States
 Historical list of the Catholic bishops of the United States
 List of Catholic bishops of the United States
 Lists of patriarchs, archbishops, and bishops

References

External links
Archdiocese for the Military Services, USA Official Website

Episcopal succession

1957 births
Living people
People from Billings, Montana
21st-century Roman Catholic bishops in the United States
People of the Roman Catholic Archdiocese of New York
Bishops appointed by Pope Francis